Pyriphis is a genus of mites in the family Ologamasidae.

Species
 Pyriphis pyrenoides (Lee, 1966)

References

Ologamasidae